Luis Vicentini (March 24, 1902 - February 9, 1938) was a Chilean boxer. 
In 1922 he starred in Carlos F. Borcosque's debut picture Hombres de esta tierra.

References

External links

1902 births
1938 deaths
People from Chillán
Chilean people of Italian descent
Chilean male boxers
20th-century Chilean people